Nanpu Bridge is a station on Shanghai Metro Line 4. It is named after and located near the western end of the Nanpu Bridge in Huangpu District, and is the first station in Puxi when travelling clockwise after crossing the Huangpu River from Pudong. Service began at this station on 29 December 2007.

Station Layout

References

Shanghai Metro stations in Huangpu District
Line 4, Shanghai Metro
Railway stations in China opened in 2007
Railway stations in Shanghai